U.S. Route 68 (US 68) is a United States highway that runs for  from northwest Ohio to Western Kentucky. The highway's western terminus is at US 62 in Reidland, Kentucky. Its present northern terminus is at Interstate 75 in Findlay, Ohio, though the route once extended as far north as Toledo. US 68 intersects with US 62 three times during its route.

Route description

US 68 is signed east–west in Kentucky, while in Ohio it is signed north–south.

Kentucky

U.S. Route 68 is designated as a "Scenic Highway" throughout Kentucky. US 68 passes near or through Reidland, Aurora, Cadiz, Hopkinsville, Elkton, Russellville, Auburn, Bowling Green, Glasgow, Edmonton, Greensburg, Campbellsville, Lebanon, Perryville, Harrodsburg, Lexington, Paris, and Maysville.

The majority of the route winds through forested, hilly terrain. US 68 is Broadway through downtown Lexington, and it is Harrodsburg Road before it leaves Lexington.

The route passes several Civil War battle sites. The Battle of Tebbs Bend Historic Civil War Site is located near Campbellsville and the Perryville Battlefield State Historic Site is outside Perryville.

There is an annual  yard sale, held along the highway for four days in early summer.

The sections of the highway through Campbellsville and Lebanon are slated for expansion to begin in 2008. The long-term goal is to widen and make safer the entire US 68 corridor through Kentucky as part of the Heartland Parkway project.

Sections in Kentucky have been improved in recent years. The Paris Pike  was completed in 2003. Work is currently in progress to make US 68 four lanes through Land Between the Lakes. This was accelerated, following a devastating collision of the cargo vessel MV Delta Mariner with Eggner Ferry Bridge in January 2012.

Ohio

US 68 takes a south–north route throughout Ohio, roughly paralleling Interstate 75 but covering counties one tier to the east of those counties covered by I-75.  US 68 begins at the William H. Harsha Bridge over the Ohio River and duplexes with U.S. Route 52 for 5.6 miles while traveling on the north bank of the river. The highways separate at Ripley, at which point US 68 heads north as a generally rural two-lane highway, passing through or bypassing communities such as Georgetown, Mount Orab, Fayetteville, Wilmington, Xenia, and Yellow Springs. Shortly before reaching Interstate 70, it becomes a four-lane expressway, bypassing Springfield before transitioning back to a rural two-lane road as it approaches Urbana. As it continues north, US 68 passes through West Liberty, Bellefontaine, Kenton, Dunkirk, and Arlington on its way north to its terminus at an interchange with Interstate 75 outside Findlay.

In total, US 68 traverses 179.1 miles within Ohio.

History

From 1926 until the late 1940s, in terms of the routing between Bowling Green and Perryville, US 68 went westward through Springfield, Kentucky to Bardstown, and followed U.S. Route 31E southward to just east of Horse Cave. US 68 then followed the current KY 218 (Charlie Moran Highway) westward into Horse Cave, and then joined U.S. Route 31W from there through Cave City to Bowling Green. US 68 moved to its current routing from Bowling Green to Perryville around 1948–49.

US 68 previously ran to Toledo, Ohio, terminating at the west approach to the Anthony Wayne Bridge south of downtown, but the Toledo-Findlay segment was decommissioned in the 1950s. It also passed through Springfield, Ohio prior to its realignment onto a four-lane bypass of that city.

Two spans of the US 68/KY 80 Eggner Ferry Bridge over Kentucky Lake collapsed after being struck by a cargo ship on January 26, 2012. The bridge reopened to traffic on May 25, 2012. That bridge was replaced by a new four-lane bridge a few years afterwards.

Future
In Clark County, Ohio, there is an almost full-access interchange between controlled-access US 68 and US 40/SR 4, which is itself a controlled-access highway until approximately 0.3-mile west of the US 68 interchange. One exit ramp from US 68 ends on Upper Valley Pike, rather than on US 40/SR 4; another entrance ramp includes two-way traffic and an at-grade entrance to a retirement community. On US 40/SR 4 between the controlled-access portion and US 68, there are an at-grade intersection at Upper Valley Pike, other street and driveway breaks in access control and a steep grade on the eastbound approach toward Upper Valley Pike. In September 2013, the Clark County-Springfield Transportation Coordinating Committee (TCC) ranked the US 40/SR 4/Upper Valley Pike intersection as the most hazardous in the county, based on 2010-2012 crash data. Because the road design over the years had played a significant factor in the high number of crashes in the area, the TCC conducted a study; in February 2006 it recommended reconfiguring the US 68 interchange and altering nearby traffic patterns. The Ohio Department of Transportation (ODOT) the same year approved $5 million to fund the project. However, the TCC soon rejected ODOT's money, concluding that even its recommended fix would not be enough to solve the area road network's underlying problems. Instead, the TCC is making small changes, such as improving traffic signal timing and adding signs. ODOT, for its part, is working on reducing the number of driveways near the US 40/SR 4/Upper Valley Pike intersection and on upgrading traffic signals.

In Xenia Township, Greene County, Ohio, north of Xenia, ODOT plans to convert the intersection with SR 235, the state route's southern terminus, to a roundabout. As of summer 2020, construction is expected to begin in spring 2023 and to be completed that fall, with an estimated cost of $2 million.

Major intersections

Related routes
 U.S. Route 168
 Special routes of U.S. Route 68

References

External links

 Endpoints of U.S. Highway 68

 
68
68
0068
0068
0068
0068
0068
0068
0068
0068
0068
0068
0068
0068
0068
0068
0068
0068
0068
0068
0068
0068
0068
Transportation in Brown County, Ohio
Transportation in Clinton County, Ohio
Transportation in Greene County, Ohio
Transportation in Clark County, Ohio
Transportation in Champaign County, Ohio
Transportation in Logan County, Ohio
Transportation in Hardin County, Ohio
Transportation in Hancock County, Ohio
68